Battlesaurus: Rampage at Waterloo is a 2015 young adult alternate history novel written by Brian Falkner. It is set during the Napoleonic Wars in a universe where non-avian dinosaurs never went extinct.

Synopsis
In an alternate universe, non-avian dinosaurs never went extinct. While smaller dinosaurs thrive in Europe, much larger ones live in the Americas, leading them to never become inhabited by humans. After escaping exile in Elba, Napoleon captures some large dinosaurs from the Americas and plans to use them to conquer Europe. It is up to Willem, a 15-year-old Belgian boy, to stop him, as he has the ability to put dinosaurs into a trance because of training from his father, who was a magician.

Reception and awards
The book was received positively, winning the Young Adult Fiction Award in the 2016 New Zealand Book Awards for Children and Young Adults, as well as being on the shortlist for the Ethel Turner Prize for Young Adult's Literature that same year in the New South Wales Premier's Literary Awards. School Library Journal described it as "thrilling and positively addicting".

See also
Temeraire, another alternate history book series about giant reptiles in the Napoleonic Wars

References

2015 novels
Alternate history novels
Children's novels about dinosaurs
Novels set during the Napoleonic Wars
Young adult fantasy novels